Events in the year 1896 in Japan.

Incumbents
Monarch: Emperor Meiji
Prime Minister:
Itō Hirobumi (until August 31)
Kuroda Kiyotaka (acting) (August 31 – September 18)
Matsukata Masayoshi (from September 18)

Governors
Aichi Prefecture: Tokito Konkyo
Akita Prefecture: Yasuhiko Hirayama then Saburo Iwao
Aomori Prefecture: Masa Sawa then Naomasa Maki
Ehime Prefecture: Chang Masaya Komaki
Fukui Prefecture: Kunizo Arakawa
Fukushima Prefecture: Yasutaro Hara then Ogura Nobuchika then Akiyama
Gifu Prefecture: Sukeo Kabayama
Gunma Prefecture: Motootoko Nakamura then Abe Hiroshi then Masataka Ishizata
Hiroshima Prefecture: Nabeshima Miki then Orita Hiraochi
Ibaraki Prefecture: Egi Kazuyuki then Motohiro Onoda
Iwate Prefecture: Ichizo Hattori
Kagawa Prefecture: Ichizo Fukano then Tsunenori Tokuhisa
Kochi Prefecture: Ishida Eikichi then Hiroshi Shikakui
Kumamoto Prefecture: Matsudaira Masanao then Kanetake Oura
Kyoto Prefecture: Baron Nobumichi Yamada
Mie Prefecture: Terumi Tanabe
Miyagi Prefecture: Terumi Tanabe
Nagano Prefecture: Takasaki Chikaaki
Niigata Prefecture: Baron Seung Zhi Kuwata
Oita Prefecture: Tameharu Yamada then Yasuhiko Hirayama
Okinawa Prefecture: Shigeru Narahara
Osaka Prefecture: Utsumi Tadakatsu
Saga Prefecture: Takeuchi
Saitama Prefecture: Teru Tanabe then Tomi Senketaka
Shiname Prefecture: Michio Sokabe
Tochigi Prefecture: Egi Kazuyuki
Tokyo: Miura Yasushi then Marquis Michitsune Koga
Toyama Prefecture: Tokuhisa Tsunenori then Ando Kinsuke
Yamagata Prefecture: Shuichi Kinoshita

Events
June 15 – Sanriku earthquake: One of the most destructive seismic events in Japanese history. It resulted in two tsunamis which destroyed about 9,000 homes and caused at least 22,000 deaths.
 December 28 – Nippon Flower Mills (Nipun) was founded.
 Unknown date – Penta-Ocean construction company founded

Births
April 22 – Chishō Takaoka, geisha, writer, and nun (d. 1994)
May 11 – Toshiko, Princess Yasu, daughter of Emperor Meiji (d. 1978)
July 28 – Takeru Inukai, politician and novelist (d. 1960)
August 27 – Kenji Miyazawa, author and poet (d. 1933)
November 13 – Nobusuke Kishi,  politician and Prime Minister of Japan (d. 1987)

Deaths
February 28 – Tazawa Inabune, writer (b. 1874)
November 23 – Ichiyō Higuchi, writer (b. 1872)

References

 
1890s in Japan
Japan
Years of the 19th century in Japan